West Garo Hills is an administrative district in Garo Hills of the state of Meghalaya in India. Tura town is the administrative headquarters of the district. The district occupies an area of 3714 km². In 2011 its population was 643,291. As of 2011 it is the second most populous district of Meghalaya (out of 7), after East Khasi Hills.

West Garo Hills district is located at the westernmost part of Meghalaya. The district is bounded by East Garo Hills district on the east, by South Garo Hills district on the south-east, Goalpara district of Assam state on the north and north-west and Bangladesh on the south.

History
In 22 October 1976 the Garo Hills district was bifurcated into two districts: West Garo Hills district and East Garo Hills district. The West Garo Hills district was further divided into two districts: the present day West Garo Hills district and South Garo Hills district in June 1992.

Economy
In 2006 the Ministry of Panchayati Raj named West Garo Hills one of the country's 250 most backward districts (out of a total of 640). It is one of the three districts in Meghalaya currently receiving funds from the Backward Regions Grant Fund Programme (BRGF).

Mahendraganj international border crossing
Mahendraganj-Baksiganj international border crossing is at Mahendraganj town in West Garo HIlls district in India on NH12 to Baksiganj in Mymensingh division, Bangladesh. It is an international crossing being further developed as part of the Bharatmala.

Phulbari-Dhubri Bridge on Brahmaputra river
 Phulbari-Dhubri Bridge: After the completion of Phulbari-Dhubri Bridge on Brahmaputra river, the district will be connected to West Bengal via Dhubri, Assam. A rail line extending from Dhubri till Mahendraganj International border can change the economy of the entire region. The Phulbari-Dhubri Bridge will be the longest bridge in the country.

Divisions

Administrative divisions
West Garo Hills district is divided into six blocks, after the creation of South West Garo Hills district :

Demographics

The district have a Christian 
majority (most being from Garo community) with having significant Hindu and Muslim population (most being from Bengali community). According to the 2011 census West Garo Hills district has a population of 643,291, roughly equal to the nation of Montenegro or the US state of Vermont. This gives it a ranking of 514th in India (out of a total of 640). Its population growth rate over the decade 2001-2011 was  24.02%. West Garo Hills has a sex ratio of 979 females for every 1000 males, and a literacy rate of 68.38%.

Tura has a mixed population of Garos or A'chiks (as they prefer to call themselves), Bengalis, Nepalis, Assamese, members of other ethnic groups such as the Hajong, Rabhas and Koches, Bodo and a fair sprinkling of South Indians in the Catholic Church, the teaching profession and the paramilitary forces.

Languages

Garo (or A'chik) is the most spoken language in the district. Other languages clubbed under Garo include A'Tong. Kamtapuri, locally known as Deshi is the second largest language. Hajong, Koch and Rabha are the next largest languages. Assamese is spoken by a small minority. The Muslim non-tribals along with the Rabhas, Koches and Hajongs of the plain belt mostly study Assamese as their MIL, whereas Hindu non-tribals study Bengali as their MIL. A small minority of Hindi speakers are in the district.

Culture

Places of Interest
Some places of interest in Garo Hills are Siju Cave, Nokrek Peak, Siju Bird Sanctuary, Imilsang Dare falls, Sosibibra and Rongdong falls.

Some places worth visiting in West Garo Hills are

 Bhaitbari / Wadagokgre Excavation Site
 Pelga Waterfalls
 Tura Peak Range
 Nokrek Peak in Nokrek National Park
 Nokpante Institution
 Rongai Valley
 Phulbari River side

Flora and fauna
In 1986 West Garo Hills district, along with its sister districts South and East Garo Hills, became home to Nokrek National Park.

Notable people
 P A Sangma, Most famous leader from Meghalaya. He was the Speaker of Indian Parliament and Chief Minister of Meghalaya.
 Conrad Sangma, Present Chief Minister of Meghalaya.
 Agatha Sangma, Ex Union Minister and present MP from Garo Hills. She is also the first woman MP from Meghalaya.
 Larry Sangma, A budding cricketer. Played for Meghalaya team in the Syed Mushtaq Ali Trophy and Vijay Hazare Trophy.

References

External links
 West Garo Hills website

 
Districts of Meghalaya
Minority Concentrated Districts in India
1976 establishments in Meghalaya
Autonomous regions of India